Farquhar Street is a major thoroughfare in the city of George Town in Penang, Malaysia. Created in the late 18th century, the road forms part of the city centre's civic precinct, and is notable for the colonial buildings built under British rule. These include some of the most significant civic, religious, and commercial buildings  of Penang, such as Penang High Court, Penang State Museum and Art Gallery, St. George's Church, Church of the Assumption, and Eastern & Oriental Hotel.

Located within the city's UNESCO World Heritage Site, the road was also the cradle of the top English schools in Penang - Penang Free School, St. Xavier's Institution, Convent Light Street and St. George's Girls' School. Today, only St. Xavier's Institution and Convent Light Street remain at Farquhar Street, while the other schools have since been relocated.

Etymology 

Farquhar Street was named after Robert Townsend Farquhar, who served as the second Lieutenant-Governor of the Prince of Wales Island (now Penang Island).

During his tenure between 1804 and 1805, Farquhar advocated the destruction of Malacca in order to strengthen George Town's position as the premier harbour within the Malacca Straits. At the time, Malacca had been temporarily given to the British East India Company by the Dutch, whose country was conquered by France, to prevent the colony from coming under French control. Anxious to demolish Malacca prior to the return of the Dutch, Farquhar ordered William Farquhar, the Resident of Malacca, to destroy the city using gunpowder. Only the timely intervention by Stamford Raffles (who would go on to found Singapore) prevented the total destruction of A Famosa, leaving behind a small gate which stands to this day.

On the other hand, Farquhar was responsible for the improvements in infrastructure in George Town, such as the construction of an aqueduct and a Government House, and the enlargement of Fort Cornwallis.

History 
Farquhar Street was laid out towards the end of the 18th century and appeared in the earliest maps of George Town. However, it was only named Farquhar Street either during or after the term of Robert Townsend Farquhar as the Lieutenant-Governor between 1804 and 1805.

As British officials and Europeans moved into Farquhar Street, a number of magnificent colonial buildings were erected along the road. The Anglicans completed the St. George's Church at the junction with Pitt Street in 1818, while the Catholics built the Church of the Assumption in 1857. The famous Eastern & Oriental Hotel near the western end of Farquhar Street was constructed by the Sarkies Brothers in the 1880s.

The road also became the birthplace of some of the best English and missionary schools in Penang. The oldest of all, Penang Free School (now located at Green Lane), was established in 1819 in what is now the Penang State Museum. Between 1856 and 1858, two Catholic schools, St. Xavier's Institution and Convent Light Street, were relocated to Farquhar Street; both remain at the street to this day. Meanwhile, St. George's Girls' School was founded by the Anglicans in the latter half of the 18th century; the school has since been moved to Macalister Road.

Gallery 
From west to east:

Landmarks 
 St. George's Church
 Church of the Assumption
 Penang State Museum and Art Gallery

Judiciary 

 High Court of Penang

Education 
 Convent Light Street
 St. Xavier's Institution

Hotels 
 Eastern & Oriental Hotel

See also 

 List of roads in George Town
 Architecture of Penang

References 

Roads in Penang
George Town, Penang